Patermann is a surname. Notable people with the surname include:

 Christian Patermann (born 1942), German lawyer
 Georg Patermann (1580–1628), German composer